Maclean Strait is a natural waterway through the Canadian Arctic Archipelago in the territory of Nunavut. It separates the Findlay Group (to the south-west) from Ellef Ringnes Island and King Christian Island (to the north-east).

Straits of Qikiqtaaluk Region